Eyurkenia Duverger Pileta (born 4 October 1999) is a Cuban weightlifter. She competed at the 2020 Summer Olympics held in Tokyo, Japan, where she finished ninth in the +87 kilograms division.

References

External links 
 

1999 births
Living people
Cuban female weightlifters
Weightlifters at the 2020 Summer Olympics
Olympic weightlifters of Cuba
21st-century Cuban women